Warren Fury (born 10 December 1985 in Swansea) is a Welsh international rugby union player.  He currently plays club rugby for Newcastle Falcons in the Aviva Premiership.

A product of the Wasps Academy, he first came to attention in the 2004–05 season with a number of fine performances for the first team, not least in a friendly match against Western Stormers.  Fury made a positive impact in his first year at the Wasps Academy. He made his debut for the 1st XV against Bath in January, aged just 18, and playing on the big stage did not daunt him as he went on to appear as a replacement in the Zurich Premiership semi and final. Fury missed three months in the early season through injury, making his rapid progress even more remarkable. This prompted the coaches' decision to send him to New Zealand for the summer where he gained more match time and experience playing for Auckland team.

The early part of his career was blighted by injuries which saw him briefly loaned to London Welsh to regain match fitness whilst at Wasps.

Following his return to fitness he transferred to London Irish in 2007 in search of regular first team action which culminated in him winning 2 caps for Wales on the 2008 tour of South Africa.  During the 2009 Six Nations campaign Fury was once again called into the Wales squad as scrum half cover.

Shaun Edwards described Wales' scrum-half rookie Fury as "one of the toughest kids I have ever coached physically and mentally".

On 19 May 2009 it was announced he would re-sign for Wasps. In July 2010 Fury joined Leeds Carnegie.

After release by Leeds following a knee injury and the club's demotion from the Premiership, in January after completing rehabilitation on his right knee 2012 he was signed by Bath for three months as cover for long-term injury Mark McMillan.

Having left bath spent Fury spent the summer on the international sevens circuit and was included in the Wales squad that travelled to the Las Vegas leg of the series.

Fury returned to the fifteen man code with Newcastle Falcons in the RFU Championship and aided them in the promotion back to the Aviva Premiership.  Fury started the playoffs semi-final matches against Leeds before injuring his shoulder in first leg of the Playoff final against Bedford.

References

External links 
 London Irish profile
 London Irish player detail
 Fury versus Italy
 Wasps news
 
 
 

1985 births
Rugby union players from Swansea
Living people
Wasps RFC players
London Irish players
Leeds Tykes players
Bath Rugby players
Welsh rugby union players
Wales international rugby union players
Newcastle Falcons players
Rugby union scrum-halves